Bank is a surname. Notable people with the surname include:

Christian Bank, Danish footballer
Frank Bank (1942–2013), American actor
István Bank (born 1984), Hungarian footballer
Jan Bank (born 1940), Dutch historian
Jesper Bank (born 1957), Danish sailor
Joshua Bank, Russian writer and rabbi
Lawrence C. Bank, American engineer
Linda Bank (born 1986), Dutch swimmer
Melissa Bank (born 1961), American writer
Ondřej Bank (born 1980), Czech alpine skier

See also
Zsuzsa Bánk (born 1965), German writer
Banks (surname)